The 6th Saturn Awards were awarded to media properties and personalities deemed by the Academy of Science Fiction, Fantasy and Horror Films to be the best in science fiction, fantasy and horror released in the year 1979. They were awarded on February 24, 1979.

Winners and nominees
Below is a complete list of nominees and winners. Winners are highlighted in bold.

Film awards

References

External links
 1979 Awards at IMDb
 Official Saturn Awards website

Saturn
Saturn Awards ceremonies
Saturn